Constant Joacim (3 March 1908 in Berchem, Belgium – 12 June 1979) was a Belgian footballer.

He was a defender for Royal Berchem Sport, when he was picked for the Belgium team on 16 May 1931 (Belgium-England, 1-4). He played eleven times for the Diables Rouges, until 1937.

At Berchem, he worked with coach Émile Stijnen. The club finished third in the league in  1931, then fifth the year after, but in 1933, they were relegated to the lower division.

Constant Joacim and Émile Stijnen later reunited at Olympic de Charleroi from 1935 to 1939: they took part in the promotion of the Walloon club from Promotion C (Division 4) to the Division d'Honneur (Division 1). This famous team, composed of Flemish players, was nicknamed the "Flaminpic".

During the war, Constant Joacim played for Royal Tilleur FC and then KVV Overpelt Fabriek.

Honours 
 Belgian international from 1931 to 1937 (11 caps)
 First international match: 16 May 1931, Belgium-England (1-4)
 Participation in the 1934 World Cup in Italy (played in the match Belgium-Germany (2-5))
 Belgian D2 Champions in 1937 with Olympique Charleroi

References

External links
 

Belgian footballers
Belgium international footballers
1934 FIFA World Cup players
K. Berchem Sport players
R. Olympic Charleroi Châtelet Farciennes players
1908 births
1979 deaths
People from Berchem
Association football defenders
Footballers from Antwerp